Pseudophoxinus callensis is a species of ray-finned fish in the family Cyprinidae. It is found in Algeria and Tunisia. Its natural habitats are rivers and freshwater lakes.

References

Pseudophoxinus
Fish described in 1850
Taxonomy articles created by Polbot
Taxobox binomials not recognized by IUCN